Ki Hyun-Seo  (born May 6, 1984) is a South Korean football player.

Ki previously played for Gyeongnam FC in the K-League.

References

1984 births
Living people
South Korean footballers
Ulsan Hyundai Mipo Dockyard FC players
K League 1 players
Korea National League players
Gyeongnam FC players
Association football midfielders